The Yorke Peninsula Football League (YPFL) is an Australian rules football competition based in the Yorke Peninsula region of South Australia, Australia.  It is an affiliated member of the South Australian National Football League.  The league was known as the Yorke Valley Football League until 1996, having previously absorbed the Yorke Peninsula Football Association in 1961, and the Southern Yorke Peninsula Football League in 1994.

Media
At the moment there are several different services covering the YPFL, the main one being the Yorke Peninsula Country Times (Newspaper)

Brief history
The current Yorke Peninsula Football League developed over a number of years and involved the gradual amalgamation of the Yorke Valley Football Association, Yorke Peninsula Football Association, and Southern Yorke Peninsula Football League.

Current Clubs

Notes

Yorke Peninsula Football Association
The Yorke Peninsula Football Association was formed in 1888.

The founding clubs were:
 Cross Roads
 Moonta
 Moonta Mines
 Moonta Young Turks
 Wallaroo
 Wallaroo Young Turks (renamed from Kadina).

The final year of the Yorke Peninsula Football Association was in 1960 when the competing clubs were:
 Kadina,
 Moonta,
 Paskeville
 Wallaroo
These clubs then joined the Yorke Valley Football Association in 1961.

Southern Yorke Peninsula Football League
The Southern Yorke Peninsula Football League was formed in 1908 with 5 founding clubs, and after World War 2 the league remained largely structurally unchanged until it was absorber in 1993. The following 7 clubs remained for much of the competition's duration:

In 1919 the Southern Yorke Peninsula Football Association and the Central Yorke Peninsula Football Association merged to form the Central And Southern Yorke Peninsula Association.  This League went into recess during World War II and in 1945 the Southern Yorke Peninsula Football Association was reformed. The Southern Yorke Peninsula Football Association was renamed as the Southern Yorke Peninsula Football League in 1957.

At the end of the 1993 season, after years of diminishing player numbers, the six remaining clubs were amalgamated into two new clubs - Curramulka, Minlaton and Stansbury as the CMS Crows, and Yorketown, Edithburgh and Western United as the Southern Eagles - and the two resulting clubs joined the YVFL for the 1994 season.

Yorke Valley FA
The Yorke Valley Football Association was formed in 1930.

The Yorke Valley Football Association disbanded in 1936, but was reformed in 1945. In 1961 the Association absorbed the clubs from the Yorke Peninsula Football Association (see above).  The Association changed its name to Yorke Valley Football League in 1963. In 1994 the Yorke Valley Football League absorbed the Southern Yorke Peninsula (see above).  At that time  the participating clubs were:
 Ardrossan
 Arthurton
 Bute
 CMS (a new club, resulting from the merger of Curramulka, Minlaton and Stansbury)
 Kadina
 Maitland
 Moonta
 Paskeville
 Southern Eagles (a new club, resulting from the merger of Edithburgh, Western United and Yorketown)
 Wallaroo

In 1996, the YVFL changed its name to the current title.

At the end of the 1996 season the Central Yorke Football Club was formed from a merger between Arthurton and Maitland.

Premierships

Yorke Valley FL

Yorke Peninsula FL

Southern Yorke Peninsula Football League

2009 Ladder

2010 Ladder

2011 Ladder

2012 Ladder

2013 Ladder

2014 Ladder

2015 Ladder

2017 Ladder

2016 Ladder

Books
 Encyclopedia of South Australian country football clubs compiled by Peter Lines. 
 South Australian country football digest by Peter Lines

References

External links
 

Australian rules football competitions in South Australia
Yorke Peninsula